SS Douglas was a freight vessel built for the Clyde Shipbuilding and Engineering in Port Glasgow for Goole Steam Shipping Company in 1907.

History

She was built by Clyde Shipbuilding and Engineering in Port Glasgow for Goole Steam Shipping Company's Copenhagen service.  With her white hull, she was known as one of the "butter boats." She became the property of the Lancashire and Yorkshire Railway in 1907.

In 1922 she became the property of the London and North Western Railway and in 1923, the London, Midland and Scottish Railway.

In 1935 he was the property of Associated Humber Lines. By this time she had her hull colour changed to black.

She was sold in 1937 to the Stanhope Steam Ship Company and renamed Stanhope and later the same year to G M Mavroleon, Greece and renamed Nepheligeretis. In 1938 she was sold to B Athanassiades and renamed Hermes, then Suzy. She was renamed Ioanna in 1940.

On 1 June 1940 she was part of Convoy HG 32F. She straggled behind the convoy.

References

1907 ships
Steamships of the United Kingdom
Ships built on the River Clyde
Ships of the Lancashire and Yorkshire Railway
Ships of the London and North Western Railway
Ships of the London, Midland and Scottish Railway
Maritime incidents in June 1940
Ships sunk by German submarines in World War II
World War II shipwrecks in the Atlantic Ocean